Betty Helsengreen  (26 October 1914 – 29 December 1956) was a Danish stage and film actress.

Filmography
Week-End - 1935
En søndag på Amager - 1941
Elly Petersen - 1944
Diskret ophold - 1946
Jeg elsker en anden - 1946
Så mødes vi hos Tove - 1946
I de lyse nætter - 1948
Hr. Petit - 1948
Kampen mod uretten - 1949
Lejlighed til leje - 1949
Historien om Hjortholm - 1950
Fodboldpræsten - 1951
Den gamle mølle på Mols - 1953
Ved Kongelunden - 1953
Gengæld - 1955
Mod og mandshjerte - 1955
Be Dear to Me - 1957

References

External links

1914 births
1956 deaths
Danish film actresses
Danish stage actresses
Actresses from Copenhagen
20th-century Danish actresses